HMAS Kuttabul is a Royal Australian Navy (RAN) base located in  in Sydney, New South Wales, Australia. Kuttabul provides administrative, training, logistics and accommodation support to naval personnel assigned to the various facilities that form Fleet Base East, the main operational navy base on the east coast of Australia. A part of Fleet Base East itself, Kuttabul occupies several buildings in the Sydney suburb of Potts Point and in the immediately adjacent Garden Island dockyard. It also supports navy personnel posted to other locations throughout the greater Sydney region.

The base is named for the steam ferry HMAS Kuttabul that was sunk while docked at Garden Island during a Japanese midget submarine attack on Sydney Harbour in 1942.

History

Garden Island itself has been host to a naval base since 1856, when the government of New South Wales suggested giving the area over to the Royal Navy as a base for ships serving on the Australia Station. Following the foundation of the Royal Australian Navy in 1911, all naval establishments were given over by the UK to the RAN. However, until 1939, the ownership of Garden Island itself was in dispute, with NSW claiming it as its property. This was solved when the Australian government initially requisitioned the island (together with the naval base) under emergency wartime powers. The government then purchased Garden Island from NSW for £638,000 in 1945.

The Garden Island facility houses the Captain Cook Graving Dock which was, at the time of construction during World War II, the largest graving dock in the Southern Hemisphere. The dock was constructed between 1940 and 1945, by filling in the area between Garden Island and Potts Point. The dock and associated dockyard are operated under lease by Thales Australia. The northern tip of Garden Island is as of 2008 open to the public, accessible only by ferry. The area features the Navy Heritage Centre, opened in 2004, and graffiti dating to the First Fleet in 1788.

From its foundation until the establishment of the Two Ocean Policy and commissioning of HMAS Stirling in 1978, Kuttabul was the RAN's main naval base. With the establishment of two main bases, Kuttabul and Garden Island took on the additional designation of Fleet Base East.

Facilities and operational units
Although Kuttabul is the main administrative part of Fleet Base East, Fleet Base East is also responsible for the Mine Counter Measures forces of the RAN stationed on the east coast. These are based at HMAS Waterhen.

Ships stationed

Gallery

See also
 
List of Royal Australian Navy bases
Naval Base Sydney

References

Kuttabul
Kuttabul
Military installations established in 1856
1856 establishments in Australia
Buildings and structures in Sydney
Military installations in New South Wales
Garden Island (New South Wales)
Potts Point, New South Wales